Barbus myersi is a species of ray-finned fish in the genus Barbus.

Footnotes 

 

M
Fish described in 1939